The two kingdoms doctrine is a Protestant Christian doctrine that teaches that God is the ruler of the whole world and that he . The doctrine is held by Lutherans and represents the view of some Calvinists. John Calvin significantly modified Martin Luther's original two kingdoms doctrine and certain neo-Calvinists have adopted a different view known as transformationalism.

The two kingdoms doctrine is held in Anabaptist Christianity, which teaches that there exist two kingdoms on earth that do not share communion with one another. This doctrine states that while people of the kingdom of this world use weapons to fight one another, those of the kingdom of Christ strive to follow Jesus.

In Lutheran theology
Augustine's model of the City of God was the foundation for Luther's doctrine, but Luther goes farther.

According to the two kingdom doctrine, the spiritual kingdom, made up of true Christians, does not need the sword. The biblical passages dealing with justice and retribution, therefore, are only in reference to the first kingdom. Luther also uses this idea to describe the relationship of the church to the state. He states that the temporal kingdom has no authority in matters pertaining to the spiritual kingdom. He pointed to the way in which the Roman Catholic Church had involved itself in secular affairs, and princes' involvement in religious matters, especially the ban on printing the New Testament.

This law-gospel distinction parallels and amplifies the Luther's doctrine of Christians being at the same time saint and sinner, a citizen of both kingdoms. Luther described them as slaves of sin, the law, and death while alive and existing in the earthly kingdom, but when dead in Christ, they become instead lords over sin, the law, and death. The law-gospel distinction can be traced back to Philip Melancthon's 1521 commentary on Romans, and Melancthon's 1521 Loci Communes.

In Reformed theology 
Calvin, as well as later Reformed orthodox figures, clearly distinguish between God's redemptive work of salvation and earthly work of providence. Scottish theologian Andrew Melville is especially well known for articulating this doctrine, and the Scottish Second Book of Discipline clearly defined the spheres of civil and ecclesiastical authorities. High orthodox theologians such as Samuel Rutherford also used the Reformed concept and terminology of the two kingdoms. Francis Turretin further developed the doctrine by linking the temporal kingdom with Christ's status as eternal God and creator of the world, and the spiritual kingdom with his status as incarnate son of God and redeemer of humanity.

The Reformed application of the doctrine differed from the Lutheran in the matter of the external government of the church. Lutherans were content to allow the state to control the administration of the church, a view in the Reformed world shared by Thomas Erastus. In general, however, the Reformed followed Calvin's lead in insisting that the church's external administration, including the right to excommunicate, not be handed over to the state.

In Anabaptism
Anabaptist Christianity adheres to "two kingdoms doctrine", which teaches that:

Response and influence
Luther's articulation of the two kingdoms doctrine had little effect on the practical reality of church government in Lutheran territories during the Reformation. With the rise of cuius regio, eius religio, civil authorities had extensive influence on the shape of the church in their realm, and Luther was forced to cede much of the power previously granted to church officers starting in 1525. However, Calvin was able to establish after significant struggle in Geneva under the Ecclesiastical Ordinances a form of church government with much greater power. Most significantly the Genevan Consistory was given the exclusive authority to excommunicate church members.

See also

Christianity and politics
Separation of church and state
Cultural mandate
Law and Gospel
Opposing perspectives
Caesaropapism
Christian reconstructionism
Dominion theology
Kingdom theology
Postmillennialism
Theonomy
Political Catholicism
Political theology
"Render unto Caesar"
Sphere sovereignty
Symphonia (theology)

References

Bibliography
 
 .
 .

Further reading 
 
 .

Lutheran theology
Christian theology and politics
Christianity and government